Blurryface (stylized as ) is the fourth studio album by American musical duo Twenty One Pilots. It was released on May 17, 2015, through Fueled by Ramen. Lyrically, the album incorporates themes of mental health, doubt, and religion. It contains the successful singles "Stressed Out" and "Ride", both of which reached the top-five on the US Billboard Hot 100.

Blurryface was well-received by critics, who complimented its themes and musical diversity. It is considered to be the band's breakthrough album, becoming their first and only release to reach number one on the Billboard 200, thus far. The album has sold over 1.5 million copies in the United States as of April 2017. In 2018, Blurryface became the first album in the digital era to have every track receive at least a gold certification from the Recording Industry Association of America.  On May 15, 2019, it reached the milestone of being on the Billboard 200 chart for four consecutive years, never leaving the chart up until that point. It is also the most-streamed rock album in history, with over 5.9 billion plays.

Background and recording 

Following the release of their third album Vessel (2013), the band toured extensively in support of the album worldwide. While on tour the band had a portable recording studio that allowed them to lay down ideas.

"Heavydirtysoul", "Fairly Local", "Tear in My Heart", "Lane Boy" and "Doubt" were recorded with producer Ricky Reed at Serenity West Recording in Hollywood, California. "Stressed Out", "Polarize", "Hometown" and "Not Today" were recorded with producer Mike Elizondo at Can Am in Tarzana, California. "Ride" was recorded with Reed at Sonic Lounge Studios in Grove City, Ohio. "The Judge" was recorded with producer Mike Crossey at Livingston Studios in London. "We Don't Believe What's on TV" and "Goner" were recorded with Reed at Paramount Recording Studios in Hollywood, California. "Message Man" was recorded with Tim Anderson at Werewolf Heart in Los Angeles, California. The album was mixed by Neal Avron, with assistance from Scott Skrzynski, at The Casita in Hollywood, California. The album was mastered by Chris Gehringer at Sterling Sound in New York City.

Title and artwork

The album is named after a character the band created called Blurryface. According to Joseph, he "represents all the things that I as an individual, but also everyone around, are insecure about." Joseph wears black paint on his hands and neck during his live shows and music videos for the album, to represent Blurryface, saying: "Very dramatic, I know, but it helps me get into that character."

Art direction and design was done by Brandon Rike, Reel Bear Media and Virgilio Tzaj. Rob Gold was the art manager, while Josh Skubel was in charge of packaging production. Jabari Jacobs provided photography. Rike mentions on his blog about the different feel of the artwork from Vessel and how the red on Blurryface is "the color of passion, violence, and anger", although the band is famous for their content being open to interpretation.

Release
On March 17, 2015, the band announced the album's title, track listing and release date. The band's fans crashed their website attempting to pre-order the album. The band released their new single "Fairly Local" on the same day accompanied by its music video which premiered on the official Fueled by Ramen YouTube channel. On February 3, 2017, the band released the music video for "Heavydirtysoul", which was uploaded as audio only in 2015, and released as a single on December 9, 2016.

On April 6, the band released the second single of the album, "Tear in My Heart", with an official music video released through YouTube. "Tear in My Heart" was released to radio on April 14, 2015.  The third single, "Stressed Out", was released on April 28 with a music video. On May 4, 2015, the band posted a YouTube video streaming the audio of the album's 6th track, "Lane Boy", and released "Ride" seven days later through the same media; both were also singles, being released on the 4th and 12th, respectively. Between the 11th and the 14th the band toured the UK. The music video for "Ride" was released on May 14, directed by Reel Bear Media.

On May 19, 2015, the duo performed at the iHeartRadio Theater LA in Burbank, CA, to celebrate the album's release. The concert was livestreamed on iHeartRadio's website.

Composition
Blurryface is primarily an alternative hip hop, indie pop, and reggae album with influences and elements of hip hop, rock, and pop.

Critical reception

Blurryface received positive reviews from music critics. At Metacritic, which assigns a normalized rating out of 100 to reviews from music critics, the album has received an average score of 80, based on 5 reviews, signifying "generally favorable reviews". Garrett Kamps of Billboard hailed the album as a "hot mess (in a good way)", but gave it a mixed review, saying that Blurryface "doesn't quite reach the heights of Vessel".

Sputnikmusic and Alternative Press gave Blurryface favorable reviews, with the latter being the more positive. Their critic, Jason Pettigrew, described the album as "wonderful" and hailed the band's mix of genres in their songs, highlighting "Ride", "Polarize", "Message Man", "Tear in My Heart", "We Don't Believe What's on TV", "Goner" and "Lane Boy" in his review.

Accolades 
The album was ranked at number one in Alternative Presss "10 Essential Records of 2015" list. Jason Pettigrew of Alternative Press wrote that the band combined "hip-hop vistas, tinges of reggae, everyman pop, furious electronic urgency and bellicose sadness into an impossibly cohesive record". The album was included at number 2 on Rock Sounds top 50 releases of 2015 list. Blurryface was nominated for "Album Of The Year" at the 2016 Alternative Press Music Awards. The album also won the category of "Top Rock Album" at the Billboard Music Awards.

Commercial performance
Blurryface debuted at number 1 on the Billboard 200, earning 147,000 album-equivalent units (134,000 pure album sales) in the United States in its first week, making it Twenty One Pilots' highest-charting album and marking the band's highest opening week in the US. The group also made their first appearance on the UK top 40 with Blurryface debuting at number 14 and later peaking at number 5 in September 2016, becoming their first top 10 on the UK albums charts. By November 2015, the album sold 500,000 copies worldwide. The following month, it was announced the album's US sales was over 505,000 copies. By January 2016, the album had sold 592,000 copies in the US. Two months later, the album's US sales had risen to 753,000 copies. By the end of March, the album's US sales stood at 792,000. By mid-June, the album had sold 924,000 copies, and over 1 million by late July. By the end of the year, the album had sold over 1.2 million copies in the US. It was the eighth best-selling album of 2016 with over 1.5 million copies sold worldwide that year, according to the International Federation of the Phonographic Industry. As of April 2017, it has sold over 1.5 million copies domestically in the US. The album has been certified gold in Canada and triple platinum in the US. As of October 2018, the album earned 3.74 million equivalent album units, of which 1.7 million are in traditional album sales in the United States.

In 2018, the album became the first non-compilation project to have every song certified gold by the Recording Industry Association of America.

As of October 2018, the album has sold 394,727 copies in the United Kingdom and 6.5 million copies worldwide.

Tours 

Twenty One Pilots had their first international tour supporting Blurryface in 2015, titled Blurryface Tour, and composed of 113 shows across the globe. The tour began on May 11, 2015, in Glasgow, Scotland, and concluded on May 7, 2016, in Bunbury, Australia. Echosmith and Finish Ticket opened for the North American leg of this tour. Two shows on this tour were recorded at Fox Oakland Theatre and later released as a TV special and limited edition vinyl called Blurryface Live.

Twenty One Pilots began the Emotional Roadshow World Tour in 2016, which also focused mainly on the Blurryface album and character. On October 26, 2015, the tour was announced with North American dates starting in Cincinnati, Ohio, going through New York City, New York. On May 9, 2016, more tour dates were announced, including a second North American leg and dates in Europe and Oceania. The tour began on May 31, 2016, in Cincinnati at the U.S. Bank Arena, and concluded on June 25, 2017, in Columbus, Ohio. The tour consisted of 123 shows.

Track listing

Notes
  signifies a co-producer

Personnel
Personnel per booklet.

Twenty One Pilots
 Tyler Joseph – programming (tracks 1–6, 8–9 and 12), piano (tracks 1–7 and 12–14), keyboards (tracks 1, 2, 4, 9 and 12), organs (track 3), lead vocals, backing vocals, Hammond organ, synths and gang vocals (track 7), ukulele (tracks 7 and 10), synth bass (track 9), bass (tracks 1–3, 8, 9 and 11), guitar (tracks 1, 3–6, 8, 11, 12 and 14), tambourine (track 1)
 Josh Dun – drums (tracks 1–7, 9–10, 12-14), percussion (track 7), trumpet (tracks 10 and 13), electronic drums (tracks 8 and 11)

Additional musicians
 Ricky Reed – programming (tracks 1, 3–6, 8 and 14), additional vocals (tracks 1 and 8), bass (tracks 3–6, 10 and 14)
 Mike Elizondo – upright bass (track 2), programming (tracks 2, 12 and 13), keyboards (tracks 2, 9, 12 and 13), bass (tracks 9, 12 and 13), synth bass (tracks 9 and 12), guitar (tracks 12 and 13), Hammond B3 (track 13), vocals (track 13)
 Mike Crossey – programming, bass, synths and gang vocals (track 7)
 Jonathan Gilmore – gang vocals (track 7)
 Tim Anderson – synths and programming (track 11)
 Danny T. Levin – trumpet, trombone and euphonium (track 13)
 David Moyer – tenor sax, alto sax, baritone sax and flute (track 13)
 LunchMoney Lewis – additional vocals (track 8)

Additional personnel
 Pete Ganbarg – A&R
 Brandon Rike – art direction, design
 Reel Bear Media – art direction, design
 Virgilio Tzaj – art direction, design
 Jabari Jacobs – photography
 Rob Gold – art management
 Josh Skubel – packaging production

Production
 Tyler Joseph – executive production, co-production
 Chris Woltman – executive production
 Ricky Reed – executive production, production (tracks 1, 3–6, 8, 10 and 14)
 Mike Elizondo – production (tracks 2, 9, 12 and 13)
 Mike Crossey – production (track 7)
 Tim Anderson – production (track 11)
 Neal Avron – mixing
 Chris Gehringer – mastering
 Drew Kapner – engineering (tracks 1, 3–6, 8, 10 and 14)
 Adam Hawkins – engineering (tracks 2, 9, 12 and 13)
 Joe Viers – engineering (track 3)
 Jonathan Gilmore – engineering (track 7)
 Chris Spilfogel – engineering (track 11)
 Scott Skrzynski – assistance
 Michael Peterson – assistance (tracks 1, 4, 6 and 8)
 Brent Arrowood – assistance (tracks 2, 9, 12 and 13)
 Alex Gruszecki – assistance (tracks 3–5)
 Victor Luevanos – assistance (tracks 10 and 14)
 Seth Perez – assistance (track 11)

Charts

Weekly charts

Year-end charts

Decade-end charts

Certifications

Release history

See also 
 List of Billboard 200 number-one albums of 2015

References
Citations

Sources

External links

 Blurryface at YouTube (streamed copy where licensed)

2015 albums
Albums produced by Mike Elizondo
Concept albums
Fueled by Ramen albums
Twenty One Pilots albums